T-Bone Wilson is a Guyanese-British actor, dramatist and poet.

Life
Wilson came to England from Guyana in 1962 as an engineering student. Deciding to take up drama, he trained at the Mountview Theatre School. Wilson acted in Mustapha Matura's series of short plays, Black Pieces, staged by Roland Rees at the ICA in 1970. Wilson was inspired to become a playwright himself, writing Jumbie Street March, Body and Soul (1974) and Come Jubilee (1977). Jumbie Street March was produced by the Dark and Light Theatre Company.

As a theatre actor, Wilson performed in the National Theatre's 1981 production of Measure for Measure, the first main-stage Shakespeare by a national theatre company to employ a majority of ethnic minority actors. He played Banquo in a 1984 production of Macbeth at the Young Vic Theatre.

Wilson appeared in the 1979 TV drama A Hole in Babylon, based on events leading up to the 1975 Spaghetti House siege. He also appeared in Franco Rosso's 1980 film Babylon, which portrayed sound system culture and racism in Brixton.

Writing

Poetry
 Counterblast. London: Karnak House, 1980.

Plays
 Jumbie Street March. Keskidee Arts Centre.
 Body and Soul. Keskidee Arts Centre, 1974.
 Come Jubilee. Bush Theatre, 1977. Directed by Roland Rees.

Acting

Films
 Pressure, 1976
 Black Joy, 1977
 Babylon, 1980
 Prime Suspect 2, 1992

References

External links
 

1962 births
Living people
People from Georgetown, Guyana
British actors
British dramatists and playwrights
British poets
Guyanese actors
Black British actors
Black British writers
English people of Guyanese descent
Guyanese emigrants to England